Taman is an extinct Sino-Tibetan language that was spoken in Htamanthi village in Homalin Township, Sagaing Region, northern Myanmar. It was documented in a list of 75 words in Brown (1911). Keisuke Huziwara (2016) discovered an elderly rememberer of Taman in Htamanthi who could remember some Taman phrases as well as a short song, but was not fluent in the Taman language. However, no fluent speakers of Taman remained in the area.

Language shift
Taman speakers have since shifted to Burmese and Tai Naing (Red Shan), a Tai language spoken in northern Myanmar. Matisoff (2013:25) surmises that pressure from the formerly widespread Kadu language had caused Taman to become marginalized. The descendants of Taman speakers have since been assimilated into Shan society.

Classification
Benedict (1972) and Shafer (1974) classified Taman as part of the Luish branch of languages.

Words and affixes shared exclusively between Luish and Taman are (Huziwara 2016):
negative prefix (Proto-Luish *a-, Taman ʔə-)
‘put’ (Proto-Luish *péy, Taman pe)
‘go, walk’ (Proto-Luish *ha, Taman hɔ)
‘sun’ as a compound word that includes ‘eye’

However, Huziwara (2016) notes that despite Taman sharing some similarities with Luish, Taman cannot be securely classified within the Luish branch itself, and its place in Tibeto-Burman remains uncertain. Taman also shares various similarities with many nearby non-Luish languages, including various Sal languages. Huziwara (2016) concludes that Taman is part of a linkage of Tibeto-Burman languages spanning across northeast India and northern Myanmar (i.e., comparable to Scott DeLancey's Central Tibeto-Burman languages), but does not recognizably fit into any known Tibeto-Burman branch.

Phonology
Taman has the following phonemes.
Vowels: a, e, ɛ, i, ɨ, ɐ, o [ɔ, ɑ], u, ə
Consonants: p, ph, t, th, c [ts, tʃ], k, m, n, ŋ, r, l, s (sʰ), ʃ, x, h, w (v), y

Sound changes
Below are five innovations from Proto-Tibeto-Burman (PTB) to Taman identified by Huziwara (2016).
raising of low vowels (PTB *-a > Taman -ɔ)
fricativization of velar stops in word-initial positions (PTB *k- > Taman x-)
loss of velar stops in word-final positions (PTB *-ak > Taman -a)
addition of velar stops after high vowels (PTB *-i/-u > Taman -ek/-ouk)
affrication of *gry- (PTB *gry- > Taman c-)

Lexicon
Below is Brown's (1911) Taman word list as cited and re-transcribed in Huziwara (2016:19–29), and Brown's (1911) Taman list re-transcribed by Luce (1985), as cited and re-transcribed in Huziwara (2016).

The Taman word for 'river' is the same as the word for 'water'.

Phrases and transcribed song
On March 2, 2015, Keisuke Huziwara discovered an 83-year-old woman in Htamanthi who remembered some words and phrases of the Taman language, as well as a short song. The woman was born in a village just outside Htamanthi. The elicited words and phrases are (Huziwara 2016:14–16):

hɔ əna, hɔ təyauŋ '(I) went over there.' (hɔ 'to go')
kʰam sɔ-nə-kɔ 'Did (you) eat?' (kʰam 'food, cooked rice'; sɔ 'to eat')
sɔ-kɛʔ 'already ate'
ʔə-sɔ-wɛʔ 'did not eat (yet)' (ʔə- 'negative prefix')
sɔ-nə-kɔ-ya 'ate; finished eating' (-nə 'desiderative suffix')
tʰitum ŋɔ lɔ 'Where is the water?' (tʰi 'water'; tum 'container'; ŋɔ 'where'; lɔ 'interrogative')
ʔəyɔ pe 'Where did I put it?' (pe 'to place'; ʔəyɔ 'where?')
wa dɔ 'Come!' (wa 'to come')
pi 'firewood' (cf. Meithei upi 'firewood')
məla 'tea'
məla sɔ nɔ 'Please drink tea.' (məla 'tea'; sɔ 'to eat')

The song is transcribed as follows.
ʔi ʔələyaŋ ʔi ʔələyaŋ
nənum təhɔ ʔinahɔ
məceiʔ cɔ he lɔcɔ ci
məceiʔ cɔ ʔi na
nam ha mina
hɔ pi cɔ

Huziwara (2016:15–16) analyzes the song as follows.
ʔi ʔələyaŋ ʔi ʔələyaŋ: exclamation introducing the song
nənum təhɔ ʔina hɔ: 'The child went.'
məceiʔcɔ he: 'Where is the child?' (Taman məceiʔcɔ 'child' < PTB *tsa-n)
lɔcɔ ci: [meaning unclear]
məceiʔcɔ, ʔina: 'I told the child'
nam ha mina: 'Where did you go?'
hɔ pi cɔ: 'I went outside.'

Altogether, the nouns, verbs, and prefixes elicited from Huziwara's (2016) Taman informant are:
kʰam 'food, cooked rice'
tʰi 'water'
məla 'tea'
pi 'firewood'
tum 'container'
məceiʔcɔ 'child'
ʔə- 'negative prefix'
sɔ 'to eat'
hɔ 'to go'
wa 'to come'
pe 'to place, put'

Notes

References

 
 
 
 
 
 

Languages of Myanmar
Unclassified Sino-Tibetan languages